Guatemala participated in the 2010 Summer Youth Olympics in Singapore.

The Guatemalan squad consisted of 12 athletes competing in 8 sports: aquatics (swimming), equestrian, gymnastics, judo, modern pentathlon, sailing, shooting and weightlifting.

Medalists

Equestrian

Gymnastics

Artistic Gymnastics

Girls

Judo

Individual

Modern pentathlon

Sailing

One Person Dinghy

Windsurfing

Shooting

Pistol

Rifle

Swimming

Weightlifting

References

External links
Competitors List: Guatemala

Nations at the 2010 Summer Youth Olympics
2010 in Guatemalan sport
Guatemala at the Youth Olympics